Castlereagh is a suburb of Sydney, in the state of New South Wales, Australia.

History
The suburb is one of the most historic sites in Australia's colonial history, being one of the five Macquarie towns officially proclaimed on 6 December 1810. Governor Lachlan Macquarie recorded the following in his journal "the Township for the Evan or Nepean District I have named Castlereagh in honor (sic) of Lord Viscount Castlereagh", Secretary of State for War and the Colonies 1805–1806. He, in turn, was named after Castlereagh in Northern Ireland.  The official Government and General Order issued from Government House, Sydney was dated 15 December 1810.

The earliest known European development was the building of Hadley Park, between what is now Castlereagh Road and the Nepean River. Charles Hadley was given a grant in 1803, and his house, Hadley Park, was built . It still stands, largely intact. It has been said that it is difficult to overestimate the significance of this building. It was one of the earliest buildings in the colony and is "probably unique in its condition and setting". The property is listed on the New South Wales State Heritage Register.

Nepean Park, is also situated on Castlereagh Road, and was built by convict labour for John Single. A notable two-storey farmhouse in the Georgian style, it was acquired by the Dixon family in 1934. It is listed on the (now defunct) Register of the National Estate and the NSW State Heritage Register.

Castlereagh Post Office opened on 1 April 1857 and closed in 1967.

After two hundred years, the rich river flats still provide for a thriving agricultural industry along the Nepean River. Many of Penrith district's pioneering families had originated from Castlereagh. The suburb's historical importance is reflected in its many surviving farmhouses, outbuildings, churches and cemeteries.

Heritage listings 
Castlereagh has a number of heritage-listed sites, including:
 Castlereagh Road: Upper Castlereagh Public School
 14-278 Old Castlereagh Road: Hadley Park

Demographics
According to the 2016 census, there were 1,171 residents in Castlereagh. 78.8% of people were born in Australia and 82.6% of people only spoke English at home. The most common responses for religion were Catholic 39.4%, Anglican 21.3% and No Religion 13.7%.

Transport
Castlereagh Road is one of the important transport links in Sydney connecting the Hawkesbury and Penrith regions.

Schools
The area has historic public school buildings, the Upper Castlereagh Public School and residence. Situated on Castlereagh Road, superseding a Wesleyan schoolhouse on the opposite side of the road, this was designed by G. A. Mansfield and constructed by James Evans, 1878-1879.

There is also a K-12 parent-controlled Christian school, The Lakes Christian College. There is also a K-6 Principal controlled Primary school, Lower Castlereagh Public School, now known as Castlereagh Public School.

References

External links 

 Penrith Local Suburb Profiles
 The Lakes Christian College

Suburbs of Sydney
1810 establishments in Australia